Doug Didero (born August 18, 1960 in Hamilton, Ontario and currently living in Mooresville, North Carolina), is a former driver in the Indy Racing League.  He raced in the 1999–2000 seasons with 6 career starts.  His best career IRL finish was in 14th position in the Delphi Indy 200 at Walt Disney World Speedway.  In 1991–1992 he raced 3 times in the NASCAR Busch Series.

Didero is best known for his success in the Supermodified division at Oswego Speedway and in ISMA, where he and car owner Skip Matczak won two dozen features on his way to three consecutive Track Championships in 1994, 1995 and 1996, capped by wins in the 1996 International Classic. He is also one of the all-time winningest drivers in the history of the track. After years away from the sport in the late '90s/early 2000s, Didero returned to semi-regular Supermodified racing, and was the winner of the 2008 Oswego Speedway International Classic 200 driving a supermodified on its maiden voyage on the track. Following 2008 classic Didero returned to full-time racing action with moderate success.  He retired at the end of the 2010 season after conflicts with his car owner as well as other drivers at the track.

Motorsports career results

NASCAR
(key) (Bold – Pole position awarded by qualifying time. Italics – Pole position earned by points standings or practice time. * – Most laps led.)

Busch Series

American open–wheel racing results
(key) (Races in bold indicate pole position)

Indy Racing League

Indianapolis 500

References

External links
 

1960 births
Racing drivers from Ontario
Living people
IndyCar Series drivers
IndyCar Series team owners
NASCAR drivers
Sportspeople from Hamilton, Ontario
USAC Silver Crown Series drivers